Eight teams competed in the women's football tournament at the 2000 Summer Olympics. In addition to the host nation, Australia, seven other teams qualified for the tournament based on the results from the 1999 FIFA Women's World Cup.

Method
Unlike the men's competition, there was no fixed slot allocation for the women's tournament. Instead, the 1999 FIFA Women's World Cup would be used as the preliminary competition to qualify teams for the women's Olympic football tournament, which featured eight teams. Australia automatically qualified for the tournament as hosts, with the remaining spots going to the top seven teams at the Women's World Cup, excluding Australia. FIFA set the following qualification procedure to determine the remaining seven teams:

 If Australia are one of the eight quarter-finalists, all eight will qualify for the Olympics.
 If Australia are not one of the eight quarter-finalists, the four quarter-final winners and the three best-ranked quarter-final losers will qualify for the Olympics.

To determine the best three quarter-final losers, FIFA set the following ranking criteria:

 Goal difference in the quarter-finals;
 Number of goals scored in the quarter-finals;
 Points obtained in all group matches (three points for a win, one for a draw, none for a defeat);
 Goal difference in all group matches;
 Number of goals scored in all group matches;
 FIFA Fair Play ranking;
 Drawing of lots.

1999 FIFA Women's World Cup

Qualification

Sixteen teams qualified for the 1999 FIFA Women's World Cup in the United States based on a fixed slot allocation.

Group stage

Knockout stage

Quarter-final ranking
As Australia were eliminated in the group stage, the results of the quarter-finals were used to determine the seven teams which would qualify. Although Russia and Sweden both lost by two goals, the Swedes had scored in their defeat while Russia did not, leaving them as the only quarter-finalist to not qualify for the Olympics.

Rules for classification: Tiebreakers

Qualified teams
The following teams qualified for the 2000 Summer Olympic women's football tournament:

Breakdown by confederation

References

External links
Olympic Football Tournaments Sydney 2000 – Women, FIFA.com

Qualification